Ihaia West (born 16 January 1992) is a New Zealand rugby union player who currently plays for Toulon in the Top 14 in France. West played at under-20 level for New Zealand.

Career
West made his provincial debut for Hawke's Bay in 2012.

In 2013, he was named as the sole First Five-Eighth in the Maori All Blacks squad for their tour to North America.

At the start of 2014, West was called into the  squad as injury cover, but was never included in a matchday squad for the Hamilton-based side.

In April 2014, West was called into the Blues squad, as injury replacement for Baden Kerr who was ruled out for the remainder of the 2014 Super Rugby season.

On 2 May 2014 West had his debut Super Rugby match for the Blues against the Queensland Reds at Eden Park where he scored a try.

On 7 June 2017, West scored the match winning try against the touring British and Irish Lions at Eden Park, with 6 minutes remaining. He added the conversion to push his side to a 22 - 16 final scoreline in what was the first Lions defeat on tour.

On 4 April 2018, West moved to France as he signed for Top 14 side La Rochelle from the 2018-19 season. West won the 2021-2022 Heineken Champions Cup with La Rochelle as their primary First Five-Eighth, kicking 9 points for them in the final against the heavy favourites Leinster. On 5 December 2021, West signed for Top 14 rivals Toulon on a three year deal ahead of the 2022-23 season.

Honours

Club 
 Hawke's Bay
2015 ITM Cup Championship Division

 La Rochelle
European Rugby Champions Cup: 2021–2022

Individual
Top 14 top points scorer: 2018–19 (257 points)

References

External links
 
 Maori All Blacks profile

1992 births
Living people
New Zealand rugby union players
Rugby union fly-halves
Hawke's Bay rugby union players
Blues (Super Rugby) players
Hurricanes (rugby union) players
Stade Rochelais players
RC Toulonnais players
People educated at Napier Boys' High School
Ngāti Kahungunu people
Māori All Blacks players
People from Havelock North
Rugby union players from the Hawke's Bay Region